Andrew Koczka (born 9 September 1965) is an Australian former soccer player who played at both professional and international levels, as a midfielder.

Career
Koczka played club football in Australia for St. George Saints and Newcastle Breakers.

Koczka made the first of five appearances for Australia in March 1988 in an Olympic qualification match against Taiwan in Adelaide. He also competed at the 1988 Summer Olympics, making one appearance in the tournament. Citing business interests, Koczka retired from international football in 1990.

References

1965 births
Living people
Australian soccer players
Australia international soccer players
National Soccer League (Australia) players
Footballers at the 1988 Summer Olympics
Olympic soccer players of Australia
Association football midfielders
Newcastle Breakers FC players